Isleta del Moro is a fishing town located near Los Escullos, in Cabo de Gata. It was frequented by Arabs and Berbers, and it was named after the Berber leader Mohamed Arráez. In May 2018 it was shot Terminator: Dark Fate.

References

External links
 
 

Populated places in the Province of Almería
Beaches of Andalusia
Cabo de Gata-Níjar Natural Park